(often stylized in all uppercase as STINGER) is a Japanese villanous professional wrestling stable, based in the Pro Wrestling Noah (Noah) promotion formed in 2018. Leaded by Hayata, the stable also consists of Chris Ridgeway, Yoshinari Ogawa, Yuya Susumu and Seiki Yoshioka.

History

Formation. Under Kotaro Suzuki and Yoshinari Ogawa's leadership (2018-2020)

In October 2018, Kotaro Suzuki began a rivalry with the Ratel's stable during which he was joined by Yoshinari Ogawa. On October 30, Suzuki defeated Ratel's leader Daisuke Harada to win the GHC Junior Heavyweight Championship for the third time. Harada demanded a rematch which Suzuki accepted on condition that if Harada lost, Ratel's would be forced to disband. On December 16 at Great Voyage In Yokohama Vol. 2, Suzuki lost the title against Harada and after the match Yo-Hey turned against Ratel's to join Suzuki and Ogawa and the three were dubbed Stinger.

On January 4, 2020, Ogawa defeated Hayata to win the GHC Junior Heavyweight Championship.

The rebirth of the stable. Under Hayata's leadership (2020-present)

On March 29, Ogawa disbanded Stinger. On April 19 at The Spirit, Suzuki defeated Ogawa to win the GHC Junior Heavyweight Championship for the fourth time. Suzuki then asked Ogawa to team up with him to fight for the GHC Junior Heavyweight Tag Team Championship, which Ogawa accepted. On May 9, during the GHC Junior Heavyweight Tag Team Championship tournament against Ratel's (Hayata and Yo-Hey), Hayata turned on Yo-Hey, joining Suzuki and Ogawa to reform Stinger. The following day, Hayata and Ogawa defeated Ratel's (Tadasuke and Yo-Hey) to win the vacant GHC Junior Heavyweight Tag Team Championship, meaning Stinger held both Noah's Junior Heavyweight Championships. On August 8 at NOAH The Chronicle Vol. 3, Hayata defeated former Ratel's teammate Daisuke Harada to win the IPW:UK Junior Heavyweight Championship and in a behind-the-scenes interview he threw the title in a trash can, causing the title to be deactivated. On October 11, Hayata and Ogawa lost the GHC Junior Heavyweight Tag Team Championship to Momo no Seishun Tag (Atsushi Kotoge and Daisuke Harada).

Arrival of Seiki Yoshioka
On May 2, 2021, During a match between Stinger and Full Throttle, Seiki Yoshioka turned against Hajime Ohara, leaving Full Throttle to become the fourth member of Stinger. On May 31, Hayata and Ogawa lost the GHC Junior Heavyweight Tag Team Championship to Harada and Hajime Ohara.

On August 1, at Cross Over 2021 In Hiroshima, Yoshioka and Susumu defeated Daisuke Harada and Hajime Ohara to win the GHC Junior Heavyweight Tag Team Championship. On September 12 at N-1 Victory, they lost the titles against Kotoge and Ohara.

At Noah The New Year 2022 on January 1, Seiki Yoshioka and Yuya Susumu fell short to  Kongo (Aleja and Hao. At Noah Bumper Crop 2022 In Sendai on January 16, Hayata and Yuya Susumu fell short to Atsushi Kotoge and Hajime Ohara. At Noah Gain Control 2022 In Nagoya on February 23, Hayata and Yuya Susumu dropped the GHC Junior Heavyweight Tag Team Championship to Atsushi Kotoge and Yo-Hey. At Noah Great Voyage in Fukuoka 2022 on March 21, Hayata and Yoshinari Ogawa defeated Eita and Super Crazy. On the first night of the Noah Majestic 2022 event from April 29, Chris Ridgeway and Yoshinari Ogawa went into a time limit draw against stablemates Seiki Yoshioka and Yuya Susumu in a match disputed for the GHC Junior Heavyweight Tag Team Championship, and Seiki Yoshioka fell short to Xtreme Tiger. On the second night from April 30, Chris Ridgeway, Hayata, Seiki Yoshioka, Yoshinari Ogawa and Yuya Susumu defeated Los Perros del Mal de Japón (Eita, El Texano Jr., Kotaro Suzuki, Nosawa Rongai and Super Crazy). At Noah Dream On Final on May 21, 2022, Chris Ridgeway and Yoshinari Ogawa went on a time-limit draw against Seiki Yoshioka and Yuya Susumu in an intern stable clash for the GHC Junior Heavyweight Tag Team Championship, and Hayata successfully defended the GHC Junior Heavyweight Championship against Xtreme Tiger. At CyberFight Festival 2022 on June 12, Yoshinari Ogawa and Hayata teamed up with Rob Van Dam to defeat Kaito Kiyomiya, Daisuke Harada and Yo-Hey in six-man tag team action. At Destination on July 16, 2022, Yoshinari Ogawa and Yuya Susumu unsuccessfully faced Eita and Kotaro Suzuki, and Hayata successfully defended the GHC Junior Heavyweight Championship against Seiki Yoshioka. At Departure on August 5, 2022, Yoshinari Ogawa and Yuya Susumu teamed up with Kai Fujimura to defeat Los Perros del Mal de Japón (Eita, Nosawa Rongai and Super Crazy), and Hayata successfully defended the GHC Junior Heavyweight Championship against Shuji Kondo. At Grand Ship In Nagoya on September 25, 2022, Atsushi Kotoge and Seiki Yoshioka defeated Chris Ridgeway and Yoshinari Ogawa in an intern stable clash to win the GHC Junior Heavyweight Tag Team Championship, and Hayata successfully defended the GHC Junior Heavyweight Championship against Yo-Hey. At Ariake Triumph on October 30, 2022, Chris Ridgeway and Yoshinari Ogawa teamed up with Yasutaka Yano to defeat Los Perros del Mal de Japón (Eita, Nosawa Rongai and Super Crazy) in a six-man tag team match, Atsushi Kotoge and Seiki Yoshioka defeated Kongo (Hi69 and Tadasuke) to retain the GHC Junior Heavyweight Tag Team Championship, and Hayata dropped the GHC Junior Heavyweight Championship to Ninja Mack. At Global Honored Crown on November 10, 2022, Atsushi Kotoge and Seiki Yoshioka dropped the GHC Junior Heavyweight Tag Team Championship to Kongo (Hajime Ohara and Shuji Kondo). At N Innovation 2022 on December 23, Kotoge and Yoshioka dropped the Junior Tag titles again to Kzy and Yo-Hey. 

At Noah The New Year 2023 on January 1, Yoshinari Ogawa teamed up with Eita to win the GHC Junior Heavyweight Tag Team Championship. At The Great Muta Final "Bye-Bye" on January 22, 2023, Seiki Yoshioka teamed up with Atsushi Kotoge in a losing effort against Kongo (Hajime Ohara and Hi69), and Yoshinari Ogawa teamed up with Eita and Nosawa Rongai in a losing effort against Junta Miyawaki, Alejandro and Yasutaka Yano.

Members

Current members

Former members

Timeline

Championships and accomplishments
International Pro Wrestling: United Kingdom
IPW:UK Junior Heavyweight Championship (2 times) – Kotoge (1) and Hayata (1)
Pro Wrestling Noah
GHC Junior Heavyweight Championship (3 times) – Suzuki (2), Ogawa (1), Hayata (1)
GHC Junior Heavyweight Tag Team Championship (8 times) – Ogawa and Suzuki (1), Kotoge and Suzuki (1), Hayata and Ogawa (3), Yoshioka and Susumu (2), and Yoshioka and Eita (1)
Global Junior Heavyweight Tag League (2019) – Ogawa and Suzuki
NOAH Jr. Rumble (2021) – Hayata
 Pro Wrestling Illustrated
Ranked Hayata No. 253 of the top 500 singles wrestlers in the PWI 500 in 2022
Ranked Kotoge No. 294 of the top 500 singles wrestlers in the PWI 500 in 2019
Ranked Ridgeway No. 303 of the top 500 singles wrestlers in the PWI 500 in 2022
Ranked Suzuki No. 322 of the top 500 singles wrestlers in the PWI 500 in 2019
Ranked Ogawa No. 412 of the top 500 singles wrestlers in the PWI 500 in 2022

See also
Kongo (professional wrestling)
Sugiura-gun
Choukibou-gun

Notes

References

Pro Wrestling Noah teams and stables
Independent promotions teams and stables
Japanese promotions teams and stables